Teemu Laine (born August 9, 1982) is a Finnish former professional ice hockey player. He last played with HV71 in the Swedish Hockey League (SHL). He played in his sixth and final season with the club in 2016–17, in which they captured the Le Mat trophy and had to quit his career due to knee injuries.

Awards and honors

Career statistics

Regular season and playoffs

International

References

External links

1982 births
Finnish ice hockey right wingers
HC Dinamo Minsk players
HC Donbass players
HV71 players
Jokerit players
Kiekko-Vantaa players
Living people
New Jersey Devils draft picks
Tappara players
HC TPS players
Ice hockey people from Helsinki